Most Requested Hits is American teen pop singer Aaron Carter's first compilation album and fourth overall album under Jive Records. The album did not make the top 50 and has only sold about 50,000 copies. The compilation included no tracks from Carter's self-titled debut album, including one of Carter's most successful singles worldwide, "Crush on You".

Track listing
"Aaron's Party (Come Get It)" (B. Kierulf; J. Schwartz) – 3:25
"I Want Candy" (Bert Berns; Gerald Goldstein; Richard Gottehrer; Robert Feldman) – 3:14
"That's How I Beat Shaq" (B. Kierulf; J. Schwartz) – 3:25
"Oh Aaron" (featuring Nick Carter and No Secrets) (Andy Goldmark; B. Kierulf; J. Schwartz) – 3:17 
"Not Too Young, Not Too Old" (featuring Nick Carter) (A. Lindsey; L. Palmer; L. Secon; M. Power; S. Williams; V. Raeburn) – 3:08
"I'm All About You" (Andy Goldmark; M. Mueller) – 3:41 
"Leave It Up to Me" (L. Secon; M. Power) – 2:59
"Another Earthquake" (L. Secon; M. Power) – 2:51 
"To All the Girls" (K. Giola; Rich Cronin; Sheppard) – 3:26
"Summertime" (featuring Baha Men) (Martin Bushell; N. Cook; Tony Momrelle) – 3:50 
"Do You Remember" (D. O'Donoghue; M. Mueller; M. Sheehan) – 3:58 
"America A O" (Alan Ross; L. Secon; M. Power) – 3:30 
"She Wants Me" (featuring Nick Carter) (J. Coplan) – 3:43
"One Better" (A. Carter; B. Kierulf; J. Schwartz) – 3:29
"My Shorty" (A. Theodore; M. Sandlofer) – 3:41
"One Better" (Remix) (Hidden Bonus Track) – 3:19

Track information
Tracks 1–3 can be found on 2000's Aaron's Party (Come Get It).
Tracks 4–6 can be found on 2001's Oh Aaron.
Track 7 can be found on 2001's Jimmy Neutron: Boy Genius soundtrack and on the Korean edition of Oh Aaron.
Tracks 8–12 can be found on 2002's Another Earthquake.
Tracks 13–16 are original tracks.

Charts

References

2003 compilation albums
Aaron Carter compilation albums